The 1934 Combined Scottish Universities by-election was a by-election held from 7 to 12 March 1934 for the Combined Scottish Universities, a university constituency of the British House of Commons.

Vacancy 
The seat had become vacant on 30 December 1933 when the Liberal Member of Parliament (MP) Dugald Cowan had died, aged 68. He had held the seat since its creation for the 1918 general election.

Candidates 
Two candidates contested the by-election. The Liberal Party candidate was Dr George Morrison.

The other candidate was Robert Gibson of the Labour Party, who had unsuccessfully contested Roxburgh and Selkirk in 1929 and Edinburgh North in 1931.

Result 
The result was a clear victory for Morrison, who won nearly 80% of the votes.  He joined the National Liberal Party in 1935 and held the seat until his resignation in 1945, triggering another by-election.

Gibson unsuccessfully contested Dundee at the 1935 general election, and was elected as MP for Greenock at a by-election in 1936.

Votes

See also
Combined Scottish Universities (UK Parliament constituency)
1927 Combined Scottish Universities by-election
1935 Combined Scottish Universities by-election
1936 Combined Scottish Universities by-election
1938 Combined Scottish Universities by-election
1945 Combined Scottish Universities by-election
1946 Combined Scottish Universities by-election
List of United Kingdom by-elections (1918–1931)

Sources 

1934 elections in the United Kingdom
1934 in Scotland
1930s elections in Scotland
March 1934 events
By-elections to the Parliament of the United Kingdom in the Combined Scottish Universities